Olgiasca is a frazione of the comune of Colico (Province of Lecco), northern Italy. It is located in the eponymous peninsula on the northern eastern shore of the Lake Como.

A manse, consisting of the hill of Olgiasca in 1241 was leased from the church of St. Vincent by Gravedona to Piona Abbey. There was an intense agricultural activity.

In the 14th century was built the "Castel Mirabei", while in 17th century Olgiasca lost its autonomy and became part of Colico.

Sources

See also 
Colico
Villatico
Curcio
Laghetto

Frazioni of the Province of Lecco
Colico

it:Colico#Olgiasca